Bishop Benjamin Eby (2May 178528June 1853) was a Canadian minister, schoolteacher, farmer, author, and community leader. He was a pioneer of the Mennonite community in Canada
 and a strong proponent of nonresistance.

Biography

Benjamin Eby was born in 1785 at a homestead on Hammer Creek, Lancaster County, Pennsylvania. He emigrated to Upper Canada in 1806 and purchased a large tract of land in what would later become Kitchener, Ontario.
 He became a Mennonite preacher in 1809, and by 1811 or 1813  had built a log Mennonite meeting house used as a school house and for religious services. He was Bishop from 1812 and was responsible for the growth of Mennonite Church Canada in Waterloo County.

Eby authored numerous published works including a hymn book, catechism, several school texts, and a church history. His church history in particular demonstrated "the nonresistant stance and his belief that war is unacceptable in the Kingdom of God".

Eby encouraged manufacturers to his settlement known as "Ebytown". He is credited with encouraging the peaceful coexistence of Mennonites with the rest of the community, and promoted reconciliation and unity on an international scale as well.

In his mid-forties, Eby's settlement was renamed from Ebytown to Berlin, and in the year of his death Berlin became the county seat of the newly created County of Waterloo, elevating it to the status of Village. (It was designated a city in 1912 and renamed as Kitchener in 1916.)

References

Citations

Sources

 
 
 

1785 births
1853 deaths
People from Lancaster County, Pennsylvania
History of Kitchener, Ontario
19th century in Kitchener
Christians from Pennsylvania
American people of Pennsylvania Dutch descent
American Mennonites
Canadian Mennonites
American emigrants to Canada
American people of German descent
Canadian people of German descent
Canadian city founders
Burials at First Mennonite Cemetery, Kitchener, Ontario